The Beresinalied, originally known as Unser Leben gleicht der Reise (the incipit) is a Lied composed by Friedrich Wilke after the 1792 poem "Die Nachtreise" by Karl Ludwig Giesecke.

It became a symbol of the sacrifices of Swiss mercenaries in foreign service following popularization as Beresinalied by Otto von Greyerz and Gonzague de Reynold, tying it to the Battle of Berezina. The context is that Oberleutnant Thomas Legler, (1782–1835, born in  Glarus) who served in the II corps of Marshal Nicolas Oudinot in Napoleon Bonaparte's invasion army in Russia in his memoirs Denkwürdigkeiten aus dem russischen Feldzug tells how his commander during the Battle on 28 November 1812 reminded him of the song and asked him to sing it.

Of the originally 8,000 men of the four Swiss regiments (division Merle), about 1,300 were left by the time the retreating army reached the Berezina River. Under General Jean Baptiste Eblé two bridges were built across the Berezina, and the second corps crossed to the western bank to beat back the Russian troops hindering the crossing. The Swiss engaged the Russian troops on 28 November 1812 on the road to Barysaŭ. The Russians pressed back the Swiss vanguard, trying to force them back into the river. Only 300 Swiss survived the day.

The French translation of the first stanza is put as epigraph of Journey to the End of the Night by Louis-Ferdinand Céline, erroneously attributed to the "Swiss Guards, 1793": «Notre vie est un voyage / Dans l'Hiver et dans la Nuit / Nous cherchons notre passage / Dans le Ciel où rien ne luit» (Our life is like a journey / Trough the Winter and the Night; / We are looking for our way out / In a sky where everything is lightless).

Lieder
Swiss patriotic songs
German poems
Military history of Switzerland